Myxosargus nigricormis is a species of soldier fly in the family Stratiomyidae.

Distribution
United States

References

Stratiomyidae
Insects described in 1918
Diptera of North America